Bumbardai (often stylized as БУМБАРДАЙ) is a Mongolian comics series, written and illustrated by N. Erdenebayar. The comics won Grand Prize at the International Manga Award in 2015.

References

International Manga Award winners